While mirages are the best known atmospheric refraction phenomena, looming and similar refraction phenomena do not produce mirages. Mirages show an extra image or images of the miraged object, while looming, towering, stooping, and sinking do not. No inverted image is present in those phenomena either. Depending on atmospheric conditions, the objects can appear to be elevated or lowered, stretched or stooped. These phenomena can occur together, changing the appearance of different parts of the objects in different ways. Sometimes these phenomena can occur together with a true mirage.

Looming

Looming is the most noticeable and most often observed of these refraction phenomena. It is an abnormally large refraction of the object that increases the apparent elevation of the distant objects and sometimes allows an observer to see objects that are located below the horizon under normal conditions. One of the most famous looming observations was made by William Latham in 1798, who wrote:

Thomas Jefferson noted the phenomenon of looming in his book Notes on the State of Virginia:

He was unable to explain this phenomenon and did not think refraction could account from the perceived changes of shape of the object in question.
  
Other famous observations that were called "mirages" may actually be referring to looming. One of those was described in Scientific American on August 25, 1894 as "a remarkable mirage seen by the citizens of Buffalo, New York". Such looming—sometimes with apparent magnification of opposite shores—have been reported over the Great Lakes. Canadian shorelines have been observed from Rochester, New York, across Lake Ontario, and from Cleveland across Lake Erie.

Looming is most commonly seen in the polar regions. Looming was sometimes responsible for the errors made by polar explorers; for example, Charles Wilkes charted the coast of Antarctica, where later only water was found. 

The larger the size of the sphere (the planet where an observer is located) the less curved the horizon is. William Jackson Humphreys' calculations showed that an observer may be able to see all the way around a planet of sufficient size and with sufficient atmospheric density gradient.

Sinking
Sinking is the opposite of looming. In sinking, stationary objects that are normally seen above the horizon appear to be lowered, or may even disappear below the horizon. In looming, the curvature of the rays is increasing, while sinking produces the opposite effect. In general, looming is more noticeable than sinking because objects that appear to grow stand out more than those that appear to shrink.

Towering and stooping
Towering and stooping are more complex forms of atmospheric refraction than looming and sinking. While looming and sinking change the apparent elevation of an object, towering and stooping change the apparent shape of the object itself. With towering, objects appear stretched; with stooping, objects seem to be shortened. The apparent stretching and shortening of the objects are not symmetrical and depends on the thermal profile of the atmosphere. The curvature of the rays changes more rapidly in some places because the thermal profile is curved.

Image example and explanation

These three images were taken from the same place on different days under different atmospheric conditions. The top frame shows looming. The island shape is not distorted, but is elevated. The middle frame shows looming with towering. The lowest frame is a 5-image superior mirage of the islands. As the image shows, the different refraction phenomena are not independent from each other and may occur together as a combination, depending on atmospheric conditions.

See also
Mirage of astronomical objects
Fata Morgana (mirage)
Tropospheric propagation

References

External links

Annotated Green-Flash and Mirage Bibliography by Andy Young

Atmospheric optical phenomena